Palmisano is an Italian surname. Notable people with the surname include:

 Andrea Palmisano (born 1988), Italian male rower
 Antonella Palmisano (born 1991), Italian racewalker
 Conrad Palmisano (born 1944), American stuntman and film director
 Giuseppe Palmisano (born 1963), Italian lawyer
 Joe Palmisano (born 1954), American football player and coach
 Joe Palmisano (baseball) (1902–1971), American baseball player
 Linea Palmisano (born 1976), American politician
 Marcello Palmisano (1940–1995), Italian journalist and reporter
 Mario Palmisano (born 1978), Italian rower
 Samuel J. Palmisano (born 1951), former president and chief executive officer of IBM
 Vincent L. Palmisano (1882–1953), American politician from Maryland

Italian-language surnames